Shivaji High School is a high school in Karwar in Uttara Kannada district, Karnataka, India. It was founded with the assistance of the Konkan Maratha Education Society.

High schools and secondary schools in Karnataka
Education in Karwar
Monuments and memorials to Shivaji
Schools in Uttara Kannada district